Scopula caledonica is a moth of the family Geometridae. It is endemic to New Caledonia.

References

Moths described in 1979
caledonica
Endemic fauna of New Caledonia
Moths of Oceania